is a Japanese-born  American physicist and computer security expert.  He is known for helping the FBI track and arrest hacker Kevin Mitnick. Takedown, his 1996 book on the subject with journalist John Markoff, was later adapted for the screen in Track Down in 2000.

Shimomura was a founder of semiconductor company Neofocal Systems, and served as CEO and CTO until 2016.

Biography
Born in Japan, Shimomura is the son of Osamu Shimomura, winner of the 2008 Nobel Prize in Chemistry. He grew up in Princeton, New Jersey, and attended Princeton High School.

At Caltech  he studied under Nobel laureate Richard Feynman.  After Caltech, he went on to work at Los Alamos National Laboratory, where he continued his hands-on education in the position of staff physicist with Brosl Hasslacher and others on subjects such as Lattice Gas Automata.

In 1989, he became a research scientist in computational physics at the University of California, San Diego, and senior fellow at the San Diego Supercomputer Center. Shimomura also became a noted computer security expert, working for the National Security Agency.

In 1992, he testified before Congress on issues regarding the privacy and security (or lack thereof) on cellular telephones.
Author Bruce Sterling described his first meeting with Shimomura in the documentary Freedom Downtime:

He is best known for events in 1995, when he assisted with tracking down the computer hacker Kevin Mitnick. In that year Shimomura also received prank calls which popularized the phrase "My kung fu is stronger than yours", equating it with hacking. Shimomura and journalist John Markoff wrote a book, Takedown, about the pursuit, and the book was later adapted into a movie with a very similar name, Track Down. Shimomura, himself, appeared in a brief cameo in the movie. 

Shimomura worked for Sun Microsystems during the late 1990s.

Shimomura was a founder of privately held fabless semiconductor company Neofocal Systems, and served as CEO and CTO until 2016.

Criticism
Kevin Mitnick and others have raised legal and ethical questions concerning Shimomura's involvement in his case. California author Jonathan Littman wrote a 1996 book about the case called The Fugitive Game: Online with Kevin Mitnick, in which he presented Mitnick's side of the story, which was a very different version from the events written in Shimomura and Markoff's Takedown. In his book, Littman made allegations of journalistic impropriety against Markoff and questioned the legality of Shimomura's involvement in the matter, as well as suggesting that many parts of Takedown were fabricated by its authors for self-serving purposes. Mitnick's autobiography, Ghost in the Wires, further expands on concerns that Shimomura's involvement in the case was both unethical and illegal.

Writing credits
 Takedown: The Pursuit and Capture of Kevin Mitnick, America's Most Wanted Computer Outlaw—By the Man Who Did It (with John Markoff), 1996, Hyperion Books.  
 French title: Cybertraque, 1998, 
 Dutch title: De klopjacht, 1996, 
 German Title: Data Zone - Die Hackerjagd im Internet, 1996, 
 Spanish Title: Takedown. Persecución y captura de Kevin Mitnick, el forajido informático más buscado de Norteamérica. Una crónica escrita por el hombre que lo capturó., 1997, 
 "Minimal Key Lengths for Symmetric Ciphers to Provide Adequate Commercial Security", January 1996 (co-authors: Shimomura, Bruce Schneier, Ronald L. Rivest, Matt Blaze, Whitfield Diffie, Eric Thompson, Michael Wiener) (pdf)

References

External links
Shimomura biography
Web site for the book

1996 Charlie Rose interview with Shimomura

Living people
American technology writers
1964 births
California Institute of Technology alumni
People from Princeton, New Jersey
Princeton High School (New Jersey) alumni
People associated with computer security
People from Nagoya
Japanese emigrants to the United States